Otero is a Spanish surname and occasional given name. Otero may also refer to:

Otero, Spain
Otero County, Colorado
Otero County, New Mexico